Cornelia Gerardina Boellaard, known as Corrie (6 February 1869, Nijmegen - 29 November 1934, Laren) was a Dutch painter and graphic artist. She was also referred to as "Corrie Rink-Boellaard" and "Corrie Treub-Boellaard".

Biography 
Boellaard was born into a prominent Dutch family, with numerous members in government and the military. Her father, Jan Willem Boellaard (1830-1923), was a military officer and landowner in Herwijnen who served as an adjutant to Queen Wilhelmina. 

She studied with Gerard Overman (1855-1906) in Amsterdam, then with Jules Joseph Lefebvre and Tony Robert-Fleury at the Académie Julian in Paris. In 1899, she married the painter, who also acted as her teacher. He died prematurely in 1903.

She exhibited at the Nationale Tentoonstelling van Vrouwenarbeid 1898 (National Exhibition of Women's Labor), De Vrouw 1813–1913 (The Woman) and the Exhibition of Living Masters.

References

Further reading 
Bep de Boer (2005) "Het land van Mauve : Cornelia Gerardina Boellaard" in Kwartaalbericht, of the Historische Kring Laren, nr. 93 (2005-3), pp.10-11.

External links

1869 births
1934 deaths
19th-century Dutch women artists
20th-century Dutch women artists
Dutch women painters
Dutch portrait painters
Académie Julian alumni
People from Nijmegen